Victoria Anne Wassell Graham  Smith (born 1950), is a British botanist who worked at the Natural History Museum.

She studied Plant taxonomy at Reading University where she obtained an M.Sc. and Ph.D.

She was born Victoria Anne Wassell Smith and married John Graham in 1978.

References

 

1950 births
British botanists
People from Paddington
Living people
British women botanists
Alumni of the University of Reading
People associated with the Natural History Museum, London